Tarik Ajouadi (born 12 April 1988 in Casablanca) is a Moroccan footballer, he is currently attached to Wydad Casablanca.

External links
Tarik Ajouadi - goalzz.com

Living people
1988 births
Moroccan footballers
Footballers from Casablanca
Wydad AC players
Association football defenders